Robert Cowley is an American military historian, who writes on topics in American and European military history ranging from the Civil War through World War II. He has held several senior positions in book and magazine publishing and is the founding editor of the award-winning MHQ: The Quarterly Journal of Military History; Cowley has also written extensively and edited three collections of essays in counterfactual history known as What If?

As part of his research he has traveled the entire length of the Western Front, from the North Sea to the Swiss border.

Cowley lives in New York City, Connecticut and Newport, Rhode Island.

Early life and education 
Cowley is the son of prominent writer and literary critic Malcolm Cowley and Muriel Mauer. He attended Phillips Exeter Academy in New Hampshire, graduating in 1952. Thereafter, he earned an A.B. degree in history in 1956 from Harvard College in Massachusetts.

Personal life
He was married to Blair Cowley; they later divorced and she remarried to artist Paul Resika. They had two daughters, Elizabeth and Miranda. Miranda Cowley, is married to film producer and director Bruno Heller, son of screenwriter Lukas Heller and grandson of political philosopher Hermann Heller.  Cowley was married to Susan Cheever, daughter of novelist John Cheever from 1967 to 1975.  He married Edith Lorillard, daughter of Elaine Lorillard, who founded the Newport Jazz Festival, in 1978.  They have two daughters, Olivia Wassenaar and Savannah Cowley.

Works 
 1918: Gamble for Victory. The Greatest Attack of World War I, by Robert Cowley, New York, Macmillan Books, 1964. 
 Fitzgerald and the Jazz Age, by Malcolm Cowley and Robert Cowley, New York, Scribner, 1966.
 The Rulers of Britain, by Robert Cowley, New York, Stonehenge Press, 1982, .
 Experience of War, ed. Robert Cowley, New York, Random House, 1993, 
 The Reader's Companion to Military History, by Robert Cowley and Geoffrey Parker, New York, Houghton Mifflin, 1996, 
 No End Save Victory: Perspectives on World War II, edited by Robert Cowley, New York, Putnam, 2001,  
 With My Face to the Enemy: Perspectives on the Civil War, ed. Robert Cowley, New York, Putnam, 2001,  
 West Point: Two Centuries of Honor and Tradition, edited by Robert Cowley and Thomas Guinzburg, New York: Warner Books, 2002.  
 The Great War: Perspectives on the First World War, ed. Robert Cowley, New York, Random House, 2003, 
 The Cold War, ed. Robert Cowley, New York, Random House, 2006, 
 What If? The World’s Most Foremost Military Historians Imagine What Might Have Been, ed. Robert Cowley, New York, Putnam, 1999,  
 More What If? Eminent Historians Imagine What Might Have Been,  ed. Robert Cowley, New York, Putnam, 2001, 
 What Ifs? of American History,  ed. Robert Cowley, New York, Putnam, 1999,

References

External links 
Random House Author Spotlight
The Lessons of War Sell in Peacetime, William H. Honan, The New York Times, December 19, 1988.
Generals, Battlefields, and What Raleigh Said, Richard Bernstein, The New York Times, December 18, 1996.
Review: The Reader's Companion to Military History, Andrew Krepinevich, Foreign Affairs, May/June 1997.
[https://www.nytimes.com/1998/01/07/us/historians-warming-to-games-of-what-if.html?scp=36&sq=Robert%20Cowley&st=cse Historians Warming To Games Of 'What If'''], William H. Honan, The New York Times, January 7, 1998.
Word for Word: Historical 'What Ifs?'; Annie Could've Gotten Her Gun And Blown Away the Kaiser, David Clay Large, The New York Times, May 10, 1998.
Books in Brief: Nonfiction, David Murray, The New York Times, October 17, 1999.
Making Books; The 'What Ifs' That Fascinate, Martin Arnold, The New York Times'', December 21, 2000.
It All Could Have Been Different, Chuck Leddy, San Francisco Chronicle, September 9, 2003.
Imagine, Laura Miller, New York Times Book Review, September 5, 2004.

Living people
American editors
American military historians
American male non-fiction writers
American military writers
Historians of World War II
Harvard College alumni
Phillips Exeter Academy alumni
Year of birth missing (living people)